A digital adoption platform (DAP), also known as digital adoption solution, is an automated software tool layered on top of an enterprise application. A DAP is used for onboarding users, guiding them on how to use the organization's application, and gaining insights into users' interaction with the application interface.

Components
A digital adoption platform is an artificial intelligence-driven interface between employees of an organization and the suite of applications and software used by the organization in its daily operations. A DAP provides automated in-app user guidance with the help of interactive walkthroughs, step-by-step overlays, self-help menus, and contextual information as the user navigates through the application. DAP captures user engagement and workflow information on the backend, which can then be accessed by the organization using analytics.
 
Advanced DAPs are often built with low-code or no-code development tools, allowing businesses to make guidance and engagement workflows without altering the underlying software code.

Use
DAP helps new employees learn how to use the application on the job while they complete tasks using real-time, in-app guidance. DAP can also be considered when an application is newly introduced, upgraded, or consolidated. Customized and contextual automated support provided by a DAP reduces manual support and offline training dependency.
 
The organization can obtain insights into the effectiveness and efficiency of its application ecosystem, enabling it to understand and fix the shortcomings in its workflows. Businesses can identify application components resulting in sub-optimal user experience and low productivity and then make the necessary reconfiguration or decide on further employee training. Usage of DAP has reportedly increased user retention and engagement rate, product adoption, and return on investment on internal applications.

Challenges
Different employees of an organization may have different levels of experience in using enterprise software. The DAP, therefore, needs to deliver targeted and segmented guidance to ensure that the user experience does not get impacted by excessive or inadequate guidance information.

See also
Digital transformation
Robotic process automation
Electronic performance support systems
Web log analysis software

References

External links
Glossary of digital adoption terms

Business software
Educational technology